The action of 7 June 1780 took place during the American War of Independence between the frigates Hermione and HMS Iris. The ships exchanged fire for one hour and a half before parting. The battle resumed in written form when Hawker published his account of the battle in a newspaper, which Latouche contested heatedly.

Background 
The Franco-American alliance marked the French intervention in the American War of Independence, yielding a considerable contribution to the Naval operations in the American Revolutionary War. France and Britain fought to control shipping lanes and supply their side on the American continent, while conducting support operations and landings.

One of the French frigates involved was Latouche's 32-gun Hermione, that had ferried General La Fayette France to Boston. After a brief period installing artillery for the defence of Rhodes Island, Latouche returned off Long Island to intercept shipping to New York City.

Action 
On 7 June, Hermione was 15 miles South-East of Long Island, cruising under a fair South-Western wind, when she spotted four sails windward.  As Hermione had good nautical qualities for her time, Latouche came nearer to the wind and closed in to investigate. He soon made the strange ships to be a frigate, a corvette, a schooner and a snow. The frigate reduced her sails and ran in the wind to intercept Hermione, which took a port tack for the same purpose.

Slightly before they arrived on each other's beam, both frigates reduced their lower sails and hoisted their flag, firing a full broadside. The British frigate was the 32-gun HMS Iris, under Captain James Hawker. After overhauling Iris, Hermione turned to run into the wind, on a starboard tack, and easily sailed into the beam of Iris. The exchange of fire then resumed, and Latouche's left arm was shot through by a musket ball; he nevertheless continued to command his ship. 

After an hour and a half of cannonade at half-musket range, Iris reduced the topsail of her foremast; as soon as Hermione overhauled her, she veered into the wind and sailed away. Latouche attempted to mirror this maneuver, but his rigging was torn to ribbons, and he could not give chase.

Aftermath 
Hermione sustained significant damage to her sails, and had 10 killed and 37 wounded. She had four holes near the waterline, and four cannonballs had penetrated her gundeck. She had fired 259 cannonballs. Latouche was pleased by the performance of his officers and his crew.   

On 10 June, Hawker published his version of the battle in a newspaper, stating that Hermione had fled although an American frigate was in sight. Latouche published a letter written to Hawker, in which he stated that the rigging of his frigate was so torn that she could hardly maneuver and that Iris could have re-engaged at will. He further stated that he had attributed the retreat of Iris to her casualties, which he inferred from her low rate of fire at the end of the engagement, and was surprised to read that she had only seven killed and nine wounded. 

Rémi Monaque notes that the other ships, that both parties identify in their arguments as hostile warships, were most likely mere merchantmen trying to avoid both frigates.

24 years later, Nelson alluded to the British account of the action when a dispute opposed him to Latouche.

Notes, citations, and references 
Notes

Citations

Bibliography
 
 
 
 
 
 

1780 in New York (state)
Naval battles of the American Revolutionary War involving France
Naval battles of the American Revolutionary War
Naval battles of the Anglo-French War (1778–1783)
Conflicts in 1780
Battles of the American Revolutionary War in the New York City area after 1777
Battles of the American Revolutionary War in New York (state)